Yılmaz Gruda (born 14 July 1930) is a Turkish actor, poet, playwright, and translator.

A graduate Ankara Commerce High School, Gruda worked as a government officer and became famous in 1950s when his poems were published various journals. In 1956, he started acting by joining Cep Theatre, and continued his career at Küçük Theatre, a branch of the Ankara State Theatre. He then worked at the Ankara Meydan Stage and Nisa Serezli acting community. He briefly returned to his job in the government and worked as an engineer. He then managed the Muammer Karaca theatre. Together with Attilâ İlhan, he started the period of blue movement in Turkish poetry. Elements of traditional Turkish theatre and Anton Chekhov's influence is clearly seen in Gruda's works, who also wrote and translated theater plays. Gruda has published his poems and plays in a series of books. He also continues to appear in movies and TV series.

Awards 
 Cumhuriyet Yunus Nadi Award, 2003, Marathon "Bir Uzun Koşu"
 Behçet Aysan Poetry Award, 1999, Çerçi Zeus
 53rd Antalya Film Festival, Honorary Award, 2016

Books 
 Bir Başka O - Oratoryo, Kaynak Publication, February 2007, 
 Manzum Nasreddin Hoca Fıkraları, Kaynak Publication, June 2006, 
 Marathon "Bir Uzun Koşu", Bilgi Publishing House, June 2002, 
 Çerçi Zeus - Bir Çağdaş Mitoloji Denemesi, Öteki Publishing House, 1997, 
 Çarmıhtaki Yeni Mehmet, Öteki Publishing House, 1997, 
 Camdaki Düşman, Öteki Publishing House, 1996,
 Bir Çürümüş Kent Belgeseli, Serander Publication, 2002, 
 Tek Perdelik Dokuz Oyun, Anton Çehov, Bilgi Publishing House, 1994, 
 Şu Bizim Tiyatromuz, 1976
 Kül Altındaki Kor, Anton Çehov, 1993

Filmography 

 Yanlış anlama 2 - 2022
 Rüzgargülü - 2022
 Prens - 2022
 Cukur - 2021
 Acans - 2021
 IYi Aile Babasi - 2020-2021
 Babam Çok Değişti - 2020
 Menajerimi Ara - 2020
 Hercai - 2019-2021
 Bir Aile Hikayesi - 2019 
 Batlır - 2018
 Göktaşı - 2018
 Sorma Neden - 2018
 Şahsiyet - 2018
 Ailecek Şaşkınız - 2018
 Görevimiz Tatil - 2017
 Ver Kaç - 2017
 Yıldızlar Şahidim - 2017
 Roza of Smyrna / İsmail ve Roza - 2016
 Biz Bir Dolaşalım - 2016
 Adana İşi - 2015
 Mutlu Ol Yeter - 2015
 Gönül İşleri - 2015
 Kod Adı: K.O Z. - 2014
 Ulan İstanbul - 2014
 Olur Olur! Bal Gibi Olur - 2014
 Gülcemal - 2014
 Sürgün İnek - 2014
 Vicdan - 2013
 Galip Derviş - 2013 
 Fatih - 2013
 Aşk Ağlatır - 2013
 İşler Güçler - 2012
 Böyle Bitmesin - 2012
 Suskunlar - 2012 
 Bitmeyen Şarkı - 2011 
 Aşk Tesadüfleri Sever - 2011 
 Celal Tan ve Ailesinin Aşırı Acıklı Hikayesi - 2011
 Çakıl Taşları - 2010 
 Bez Bebek - 2009
 Aşk Geliyorum Demez - 2009
 Şeytanın Pabucu - 2008
 Kavak Yelleri - 2007
 Yabancı Damat - 2004–2007 
 Gözlerinde Son Gece - 1996 
 Aylaklar - 1994 
 Meryem ve Oğulları - 1977 
 Tek Başına - 1976 
 Arabacının Aşkı - 1976 
 Su Perisi Elması - 1976 
 Güngörmüşler - 1976 
 Kana Kan - 1976 
 Şoför - 1976 
 Aşk Dediğin Laf Değildir - 1976 
 Kuklalar - 1976 
 Vur Tatlım - 1975 
 Diyet - 1975 
 Nereden Çıktı Bu Velet - 1975 
 Kartal Yuvası - 1974 
 Fedai - 1974 
 Asiye Nasıl Kurtulur? - 1973
 Sevda Yolu - 1973 
 Cano - 1973 
 Bebek Yüzlü - 1973 
 Zulüm - 1972 
 Suya Düşen Hayal - 1972 
 Bir Kadın Kayboldu - 1971 
 Ölünceye Kadar - 1970 
 Herkesin Sevgilisi - 1970 
 Ağlayan Melek - 1970 
 Bomba Ahmet - 1970 
 Kanun Benim - 1966 
 Karakolda Ayna Var - 1966 
 Affetmeyen Kadın - 1964 
 Rüzgâr Zehra (Sünger Avcıları) - 1963 
 Kader Yolcusu - 1961 
 İstanbul'da Aşk Başkadır - 1961 
 Suçlu Aşıklar - 1961 
 Gecelerin Ötesi - 1960 
 Düşman Yolları Kesti - 1959 
 Olurum de ayrilmam - 1959 
 Daha cekecek miyim - 1958
 Istanbul macerasi - 1958
 Dokuz Dağın Efesi - 1958

References

External links 
 

1930 births
Turkish male stage actors
Turkish male film actors
Turkish male television actors
Turkish translators
Living people
Male actors from Istanbul
20th-century Turkish poets
21st-century Turkish poets